James Curtis Hepburn (March 13, 1815 – September 21, 1911) was an American physician, translator, educator, and lay Christian missionary. He is known for the Hepburn romanization system for transliteration of the Japanese language into the Latin alphabet, which he popularized in his Japanese–English dictionary.

Background and early life 

Hepburn was born in Milton, Pennsylvania, on March 13, 1815. He attended Princeton University, earned a master's degree, after which he attended the University of Pennsylvania, where he received his M.D. degree in 1836, and became a physician. He decided to go to China as a medical missionary, but had to stay in Singapore for two years because the Opium War was under way and Chinese ports were closed to foreigners. After five years as a missionary, he returned to the United States in 1845 and opened a medical practice in New York City.

Missionary work in Japan
In 1859, Hepburn went to Japan as a medical missionary with the American Presbyterian Mission. After first arriving in Nagasaki in October 1859, Hepburn swiftly relocated to the newly opened treaty port of Yokohama, opening his first clinic in April 1861 at the Sokoji Temple.  Initially residing at Jobutsuji in Kanagawa, a dilapidated temple formerly occupied by the Dutch consulate, Hepburn was the first Christian missionary to take up residence close to the newly opened treaty port.  Hepburn's family shared accommodation at Jobutsuji with Dutch Reformed minister Rev. Samuel Robbins Brown and all were quickly absorbed into the local foreign community, Hepburn being appointed honorary physician to the US Consul, Townsend Harris.

Hepburn's first clinic failed as the Bakumatsu authorities, wanting the missionaries to relocate to Yokohama, put pressure on patients to stop going to it. In the spring of 1862 Hepburn and his family relocated to the house and compound at Kyoryuchi No. 39, in the heart of the foreigners residential district in the treaty port of Yokohama.  There, in addition to his clinic, he and his wife Clara founded the Hepburn School, which eventually developed into Meiji Gakuin University. Hepburn's Japanese pupils included Furuya Sakuzaemon, Takahashi Korekiyo, and Numa Morikazu (沼間守一).

For his medical contributions to the city of Yokohama, Hepburn Hall was named in his honor on the campus of Yokohama City University School of Medicine.

In May 1867, with the collaboration of his long-time assistant Kishida Ginkō, Hepburn published a Japanese–English dictionary which rapidly became the standard reference work for prospective students of Japanese. In the dictionary's third edition, published in 1886, Hepburn adopted a new system for romanization of the Japanese language developed by the Society for the Romanization of the Japanese Alphabet (Rōmajikai). This system is widely known as the Hepburn romanization because Hepburn's dictionary popularized it. Hepburn also contributed to the translation of the Bible into Japanese.

Later years

Hepburn returned to the United States in 1892. On March 14, 1905, a day after Hepburn's 90th birthday, he was awarded the decoration of the Order of the Rising Sun, third class. Hepburn was the second foreigner to receive this honor.

He died on September 21, 1911, in East Orange, New Jersey, at the age of 96. He is interred in Orange's Rosedale Cemetery.

Publications
 (first edition) 690pp 
A Japanese and English dictionary: with and English and Japanese index (1867)
Japanese-English and English-Japanese Dictionary (1881)
 (4th edition), 962pp (gives Japanese next to romaji)
A Japanese-English and English-Japanese dictionary (1903)
 (2nd. ed. abridged), 1032pp (romaji only)

See also

 List of Westerners who visited Japan before 1868
 Sakoku

References

Further reading

External links
History of Meiji Gakuin University
Article on Hepburn in Princeton Alumni Weekly
Hepburn Christian Fellowship 

American expatriates in Japan
American Japanologists
Presbyterian missionaries in Japan
Presbyterian missionaries in Singapore
American lexicographers
Translators of the Bible into Japanese
1815 births
1911 deaths
Recipients of the Order of the Rising Sun, 3rd class
19th-century American physicians
People from Northumberland County, Pennsylvania
19th-century American translators
American Presbyterian missionaries
University and college founders
Missionary linguists